Cape Breton Highlands—Canso was a federal electoral district in the province of Nova Scotia, Canada, that was represented in the House of Commons of Canada from 1968 to 1997.

History

This riding was created in 1966 from Antigonish—Guysborough, Inverness—Richmond and North Cape Breton and Victoria ridings.

It consisted initially of:
 the counties of Antigonish and Inverness, and
 parts of the counties of Guysborough, Victoria and Richmond.

In 1987, it was redefined to consist of:
 the County of Antigonish, and
 parts of the Counties of Inverness, Victoria, Richmond and Guysborough lying to the east of the meridian of Longitude 62(30'00" West.

It was abolished in 1996 when it was redistributed into Bras d'Or, Pictou—Antigonish—Guysborough and Sydney—Victoria ridings.

Members of Parliament

Election results

See also 

 List of Canadian federal electoral districts
 Past Canadian electoral districts

External links 
Riding history for (1966–1996) from the Library of Parliament

Former federal electoral districts of Nova Scotia